Harmony Gold may refer to:
 Harmony Gold (mining), a South African gold mining company
 Harmony Gold USA, an American real estate developer, film, television, & animation producer, and distributor